Rocky Gap may refer to:
 Rocky Gap, Virginia
 Rocky Gap State Park in Allegany County, Maryland.
 Rocky Gap in Mountain passes in Montana